Melodi Grand Prix Junior 2004 was the third music competition in Norway in the series Melodi Grand Prix Junior for children aged 9 and 15 years. The winner of 2003 was the group @lek with their song "En stjerne skal jeg bli", which represented Norway at the Junior Eurovision Song Contest 2004.

The album Melodi Grand Prix Junior 2004 containing the songs of the finals reached #3 on the VG-lista Norwegian Albums Chart on week 26 of 2003 staying at #4 for 2 weeks.

Results

First round

Super Final

References

Melodi Grand Prix Junior
Music festivals in Norway